The Goshute Mountains is a mountain range in southeastern Elko County, Nevada, United States.

Description
The range is separated from the Toano Range to the north by Morgan Pass.

The range was named after the Goshute Indians.

See also

 List of mountain ranges of Nevada

References

External links

Mountain ranges of Nevada
Mountain ranges of Elko County, Nevada